John Howe Sullivan (c. 1843 - 4 November 1875) was the Gold Commissioner for the Cassiar District in the Canadian province of British Columbia during the Cassiar Gold Rush of the 1870s. He held this position from 26 May 1874 until his death.

Sullivan was one of those lost in the sinking of the SS Pacific off Cape Flattery on November 4, 1875.

References

Lost Bonanzas of British Columbia, Vol. II, Garnet Basque, Sunfire Publications (1994), Heritage House Publishing (1999), Surrey BC.  ISBN.

1840s births
1875 deaths
Interior of British Columbia
Pre-Confederation British Columbia people
19th-century Canadian civil servants
Gold commissioners in British Columbia
Deaths due to shipwreck at sea